Laurence R. Young (December 19, 1935 – August 4, 2021) was an American physicist who was the Apollo Program Professor Emeritus of Astronautics at Massachusetts Institute of Technology and an Elected Fellow of the Institute of Electrical and Electronics Engineers, the Biomedical Engineering Society and the American Institute for Medical and Biological Engineering. He received an A.B. from Amherst College in 1957; a Certificate in Applied Mathematics from the Sorbonne, Paris as a French Government Fellow in 1958; S.B. and S.M. degrees in Electrical Engineering and the Sc.D. degree in Instrumentation from MIT, from 1957 to 1962. Young was a backup payload specialist for the Spacelab mission STS-58 in 1993.

He died on August 4, 2021.

References

1935 births
2021 deaths
MIT School of Engineering faculty
21st-century American physicists
Fellow Members of the IEEE
MIT School of Engineering alumni
Fellows of the American Institute for Medical and Biological Engineering
Fellows of the Biomedical Engineering Society
Amherst College alumni
Members of the National Academy of Medicine